Magdalis armicollis, the red elm bark weevil, is a species of wedge-shaped bark weevil in the beetle family Curculionidae. It is found in North America. Larvae live within the wood of Ulmus trees while the adults feed on leaves.

References

Further reading

 
 

Curculionidae
Articles created by Qbugbot
Beetles described in 1824
Taxa named by Thomas Say